The Essex Decision was a ruling made by the English High Court of Admiralty on 22 May 1805 regarding the capture of the American merchant vessel, Essex. The decision called upon the Rule of 1756, which stated that neutral nations in wartime were only permitted to carry goods that they were permitted to carry in peacetime. Essex was ruled to have violated the Rule of 1756. This led to a sharp increase in British seizure of American ships by the same reasoning and was one of the leading causes of the War of 1812.

Background
The Napoleonic Wars from 1793-1815 created a shipping void in both Britain and France due to cargo vessels being drafted into military service and relaxed mercantilist policies. With Britain and France blockading each other, Americans helped fill the shipping void and per capita credits in the balance of payments more than tripled due to stimulated overseas commerce.

The Essex case
The Rule of 1756 makes an important distinction. Trading with the enemy was permissible so that trade carried out in peacetime was not interrupted while trading for the enemy was not permissible. The British reserved the right to interfere with trade that would not have occurred in peacetime. Since American vessels were not allowed to carry cargo to a country directly from its colonies, they would often stop at an American port to evade the British prohibition. The Lords Commissioners of Appeal in Prize Causes ruled that a brief stop at an American port did not neutralize an enemy cargo when the intended final destination was another enemy port. Essex was captured while carrying cargo from the French West Indies to France and therefore its seizure was legal under British law.

Consequences

Trade restriction
The Essex Decision introduced a series of trade restriction to impede American trade with France. The United States contested these restrictions as illegal under international law. This fueled growing tensions between the British and the United States. The British seized almost 1,500 ships in total and many American sailors were forcefully drafted into the British Royal Navy (a process known as impressment).

American response
Congress and President Thomas Jefferson were fearful of becoming entangled in war and declared the Embargo Act of 1807. This prohibited the United States from trading with all foreign ports. This attempt to gain respect of American neutrality backfired as drastic declines in export values and trade earning ensued. With building pressures in port cities, the Non-Importation Act of 1809 was passed to partially open trade. This specifically prohibited trade with Great Britain, France and all of their colonies.

War of 1812
Continuing seizures of American ships by the British and numerous other complications including disputes between the United States and Britain along the Canadian borders finally led to the War of 1812. During the war the British seized more than 1,000 additional ships and blockaded almost the entire United States coast.

See also
Rule of 1756
Napoleonic Wars
Origins of the War of 1812

References

1805 in case law
English admiralty law
Causes of war
War of 1812
1805 in British law
May 1805 events
1805 in England